Dzikowski (feminine: Dzikowska) is a Polish surname. Notable people with the surname include:

Elżbieta Dzikowska (born 1937), Polish art historian, sinologist, explorer, director, and writer
Waldy Dzikowski (born 1959), Polish politician

Polish-language surnames